Joseph Dwight Newman (September 7, 1922 – July 4, 1992) was an American jazz trumpeter, composer, and educator, best known as a musician who worked with Count Basie during two periods.

Early life and education 
Newman was born in New Orleans, Louisiana, to Dwight, (pianist) and Louise Newman, a musical family, having his first music lessons from David Jones. He attended Alabama State College, where he joined the college band (the Bama State Collegians), became its leader, and took it on tour.

Career 
In 1941, he joined Lionel Hampton for two years, before signing with Count Basie, with whom he stayed for a total of thirteen years, interrupted by short breaks and a long period (1947–1952) spent first with saxophonist Illinois Jacquet and then drummer J. C. Heard. During his second period with Basie, which lasted for about nine years, he made a number of small-group recordings as the leader. He also played on Benny Goodman's 1962 tour of the Soviet Union.

In 1961, Newman left the Basie band and helped to found Jazz Interactions, of which he became president in 1967. His wife, Rigmor Alfredsson Newman, was the Executive Director. Jazz Interactions was a charitable organization which provided an information service, brought jazz master classes into schools and colleges, and later maintained its own Jazz Interaction Orchestra (for which Newman wrote).

In the 1970s and 1980s, Newman toured internationally and recorded for several record labels.

Personal life 
Newman suffered a stroke in 1991, however, which seriously disabled him, and he died of complications from the condition in 1992.

Discography

As leader
1954: Joe Newman and His Band (Vanguard)
1954: Joe Newman and the Boys in the Band (Storyville)
1955: All I Wanna Do Is Swing (RCA Victor)
1955: The Count's Men (Jazztone) also released as Swing Lightly
1955: I'm Still Swinging (RCA Victor)
1956: New Sounds in Swing (Jazztone) with Billy Byers also released as Byers' Guide
1956: Salute to Satch (RCA Victor)
1956: I Feel Like a Newman (Storyville)
1956: The Midgets (Vik)
1957: Locking Horns (Rama) with Zoot Sims
1957: The Happy Cats (Coral)
1958: Soft Swingin' Jazz (Coral)
1958: Joe Newman with Woodwinds (Roulette)
1958: Counting Five in Sweden (Metronome) also released on World Pacific
1960: Jive at Five (Swingville)
1961: Good 'n' Groovy (Swingville)
1961: Joe's Hap'nin's (Swingville)
1961: Joe Newman Quintet at Count Basie's (Mercury)
1962: In a Mellow Mood (Stash)
196?: Shiny Stockings (Honey Dew)
1975: Satchmo Remembered (Atlantic)
1977: At the Atlantic (Phontastic)
1978: I Love My Baby (Black & Blue)
1984: Hangin' Out (Concord) with Joe Wilder
1989: Midgets (Panton)
1992: A Grand Night for Swingin': The Joe Newman Memorial Album (Natasha)
1994: Jazz for Playboys (Savoy)
1999: In Sweden (Jazz Information)
2003: Jazz in Paris: Jazz at Midnight (Sunnyside)

As sideman
With Manny Albam
The Drum Suite (RCA Victor, 1956) with Ernie Wilkins
Brass on Fire (Sold State, 1966)
The Soul of the City (Solid State, 1966)
With Lorez Alexandria
Early in the Morning (Argo, 1960)
With Gene Ammons
Twisting the Jug (Prestige, 1961) - with Jack McDuff
With the Count Basie Orchestra
The Count! (Clef, 1952 [1955])
Basie Jazz (Clef, 1952 [1954])
The Swinging Count! (Clef 1952 [1956])
Dance Session (Clef, 1953)
Dance Session Album#2 (Clef, 1954)
Basie (Clef, 1954)
Count Basie Swings, Joe Williams Sings (Clef, 1955) with Joe Williams
April in Paris (Verve, 1956)
The Greatest!! Count Basie Plays, Joe Williams Sings Standards with Joe Williams
Metronome All-Stars 1956 (Clef, 1956) with Ella Fitzgerald and Joe Williams
Hall of Fame (Verve, 1956 [1959])
Basie in London (Verve, 1956)
One O'Clock Jump (Verve, 1957) with Joe Williams and Ella Fitzgerald
Count Basie at Newport (Verve, 1957)
The Atomic Mr. Basie (Roulette, 1957) aka Basie and E=MC2
Basie Plays Hefti (Roulette, 1958)
Sing Along with Basie (Roulette, 1958) - with Joe Williams and Lambert, Hendricks & Ross 
Basie One More Time (Roulette, 1959)
Breakfast Dance and Barbecue (Roulette, 1959)
Everyday I Have the Blues (Roulette, 1959) - with Joe Williams
Dance Along with Basie (Roulette, 1959)
Not Now, I'll Tell You When (Roulette, 1960)
The Count Basie Story (Roulette, 1960)
Kansas City Suite (Roulette, 1960)
Back with Basie (Roulette, 1962)
High Voltage (MPS, 1970)
With Louis Bellson and Gene Krupa
The Mighty Two (Roulette, 1963)
With Bob Brookmeyer
Jazz Is a Kick (Mercury, 1960)
Gloomy Sunday and Other Bright Moments (Verve, 1961)
With Ray Bryant
Dancing the Big Twist (Columbia, 1961)
MCMLXX (Atlantic, 1970) - guest on 1 track 
With Benny Carter
'Live and Well in Japan! (Pablo Live, 1978)
With Buck Clayton
The Huckle-Buck and Robbins' Nest (Columbia, 1954)
How Hi the Fi (Columbia, 1954)
Jumpin' at the Woodside (Columbia, 1955)
All the Cats Join In (Columbia 1956)
Jam Session #1 (Chiaroscuro, 1974)
Jam Session #2 (Chiaroscuro, 1975)
With Arnett Cobb
Keep On Pushin' (Bee Hive, 1984)
With Al Cohn
Mr. Music (RCA Victor, 1955)
The Natural Seven (RCA Victor, 1955)
That Old Feeling (RCA Victor, 1955)
 Four Brass One Tenor (RCA Victor, 1955)
With Hank Crawford
Double Cross (Atlantic, 1968)
Mr. Blues Plays Lady Soul (Atlantic, 1969)
With Eddie "Lockjaw" Davis
Count Basie Presents Eddie Davis Trio + Joe Newman (Roulette, 1958) with Count Basie
With Bo Diddley
Big Bad Bo (Chess, 1974)
With Dexter Gordon
Swiss Nights Vol. 3 (SteepleChase, 1975 [1979]) - guest on 1 track 
With Freddie Green
Mr. Rhythm (RCA Victor, 1955)
With Al Grey 
The Last of the Big Plungers (Argo, 1959)
The Thinking Man’s Trombone (Argo, 1960)
With Eddie Harris
The Electrifying Eddie Harris (Atlantic, 1967)
Plug Me In (Atlantic, 1968)
Silver Cycles (Atlantic, 1968)
With Coleman Hawkins
Things Ain't What They Used to Be (Swingville, 1961) as part of the Prestige Swing Festival
With Johnny Hodges
Sandy's Gone (Verve, 1963)
With Milt Jackson
Plenty, Plenty Soul (Atlantic, 1957)
With Illinois Jacquet
The King! (Prestige, 1968)
The Soul Explosion (Prestige, 1969)
With Eddie Jefferson
Things Are Getting Better (Muse, 1974)
With Budd Johnson
Off the Wall (Argo, 1964)
With J. J. Johnson
Broadway Express (RCA Victor, 1965)
With Etta Jones
Etta Jones Sings (Roulette, 1965)
With Quincy Jones
The Birth of a Band! (Mercury, 1959)
 Golden Boy (Mercury, 1964)
I/We Had a Ball (Limelight, 1965)
Quincy Plays for Pussycats (Mercury, 1959-65 [1965])
With Irene Kral
SteveIreneo! (United Artists, 1959)
With Yusef Lateef
Part of the Search (Atlantic, 1973)
With Mundell Lowe
Satan in High Heels (soundtrack) (Charlie Parker, 1961)
With Junior Mance
I Believe to My Soul (Atlantic, 1968)
With Herbie Mann
Latin Mann (Columbia, 1965)
Our Mann Flute (Atlantic, 1966)
With Jack McDuff
The Fourth Dimension (Cadet, 1974)
With Gary McFarland
The Jazz Version of "How to Succeed in Business without Really Trying" (Verve, 1962)
Tijuana Jazz (Impulse!, 1965) with Clark Terry
Profiles (Impulse!, 1966)
With Jimmy McGriff
The Big Band (Solid State, 1966)
A Bag Full of Blues (Solid State, 1967)
With Jay McShann
The Last of the Blue Devils (Atlantic, 1978)
With the Modern Jazz Quartet
Plastic Dreams (Atlantic, 1971)
With James Moody
Moody and the Brass Figures (Milestone, 1966)
With Oliver Nelson
Main Stem (Prestige, 1962)
Oliver Nelson Plays Michelle (Impulse!, 1966)
Happenings with Hank Jones (Impulse!, 1966)
Encyclopedia of Jazz (Verve, 1966)
The Sound of Feeling (Verve, 1966)
With David "Fathead" Newman
Bigger & Better (Atlantic, 1968)
With Buddy Rich
The Wailing Buddy Rich (Norgran, 1955)
With Jerome Richardson
Groove Merchant (Verve, 1968)
With Shirley Scott
Roll 'Em: Shirley Scott Plays the Big Bands (Impulse!, 1966)
With Jimmy Smith
Hoochie Coochie Man (Verve, 1966)
With Dakota Staton
I Want a Country Man (Groove Merchant, 1973)
With Sonny Stitt
Kaleidoscope (Prestige, 1952 [1957])
Sonny Stitt Plays Arrangements from the Pen of Quincy Jones (Roost, 1955)
The Matadors Meet the Bull (Roulette, 1965)
I Keep Comin' Back! (Roulette, 1966)
The Champ (Muse Records, 1973)
With Clark Terry and Chico O'Farrill
Spanish Rice (Impulse!, 1966)
With Eddie "Cleanhead" Vinson
Clean Head's Back in Town (Bethlehem, 1957)
With Frank Wess
Jazz for Playboys (Savoy, 1957)
With Larry Willis
A New Kind of Soul (LLP, 1970)
With Kai Winding
Kai Olé (Verve, 1961)

References

Sources and external links
Ian Carr, Digby Fairweather, & Brian Priestley. Jazz: The Rough Guide. 
Richard Cook & Brian Morton. The Penguin Guide to Jazz on CD 6th edition. 
[ Joe Newman] — brief biography by Scott Yanow, for AllMusic
"I'm Still Learning" — Joe Newman interviewed by Les Tomkins in 1977

1922 births
1992 deaths
Swing trumpeters
Swing composers
American jazz trumpeters
American male trumpeters
Count Basie Orchestra members
Jazz musicians from New Orleans
20th-century jazz composers
20th-century American composers
American male jazz composers
American jazz composers
Orchestra U.S.A. members
Storyville Records artists
RCA Victor artists
Black & Blue Records artists
20th-century American male musicians
Roulette Records artists
Vanguard Records artists
Coral Records artists
Concord Records artists